This is a list of the 352 bus routes operated by various bus operators in Singapore, with the four public bus operators: SBS Transit, SMRT Buses, Tower Transit Singapore and Go-Ahead Singapore.

Bus routes

Routes 2-99

Routes 100-199

Routes 200-298

Routes 300-410G/W

Routes 502-599

Routes 651-672

Routes 800-883

Routes 900-991C

Other services

See also 
 Public buses of Singapore

References

Bus transport in Singapore
Singapore
Bus routes